Suseenthiran is an Indian film director and screenwriter in Tamil cinema. He rose to fame with his directorial debut Vennila Kabadi Kuzhu (2009).

Career 
Suseenthiran, who originally hails from a small village called Amarapoondi in Palani, Dindigul, was always "crazy about films" like his father and his uncle, who had made a film years ago, that never got released. Though his family did not want him to become a director and "waste" his life on films, he was sure that he would be a filmmaker one day. To achieve his dream, he came to Chennai, when he was 18 years old and needed 12 years to make his first film. Suseenthiran had worked as assistant director to prominent filmmakers as S. D. Sabha and Ezhil, before turning an independent director.

His maiden venture, titled Vennila Kabadi Kuzhu, was released in 2009, receiving rave accolades. According to Susindran, the film is based on real life incidents as his father was a kabadi player and Susindran got to know about the insults and pains the player went through, which he wanted to showcase in a film. Also he was said to be inspired from success of the 2001 Bollywood film Lagaan, which was based on cricket.

Following the success of his debut film, he started his next project Naan Mahaan Alla (2010). This film, starring Karthi and Kajal Aggarwal, opened to highly positive reviews and emerged a commercial success as well. During this film's final stages of post-production, he started working on his third film, titled Azhagarsamiyin Kudhirai (2011). Suseenthiran revealed that Azhagarsamiyin Kuthirai was planned to be his second directorial, but since no producer was willing to fund the film with an offbeat theme, he chose to make a film featuring a known lead actor first. Azhagarsamiyin Kuthirai, based on Bhaskar Sakthi's novel, likewise fetched critical acclaim. It was screened at 2011 Toronto International Film Festival in Contemporary World Cinema category. Suseenthiran finished his fourth venture, titled Rajapattai (2011), starring Vikram and Deeksha Seth in the lead. Nearly two years after Rajapattai, Suseenthiran bounces back with Aadhalal Kadhal Seiveer (2013) that has a neatly told story and a finale that touches an interesting emotional acme. In 2013, Suseenthiran prepares a commercial film with a simple story about settling scores, but the director ensures that his narration is interesting and entertaining at the same time. Suseenthiran earns appreciation for not taking the audience for granted with over the top heroism and highly illogical scenarios. He is also slowly proving to be one of the versatile directors in the circuit. Pandiya Naadu (2013) has won rave reviews from critics as well as the audiences.

Vishnu Vishal and Suseenthiran jointly made their debut with Vennila Kabadi Kuzhu and both are back once again with a super hit movie, Jeeva (2014) a sport drama. Suseenthiran has garnished the love, passion, and cricket in the right proportion to serve a fulfilling experience. His next project was an action thriller movie Paayum Puli (2015) featuring Vishal, his second after Pandiya Naadu. Then next, Vil Ambu (2016) is directed by Ramesh Subramaniam and presented by Suseenthiran. He has joined hands for the third time with his protégé Vishnu Vishal in Maaveeran Kittu (2016) a tale about a fight against the caste system. In 2017, his film Nenjil Thunivirundhal is a big disappointment considering his body of work in the initial stages of his career. He has made simultaneously shot in Telugu as C/o Surya. In 2018, he has directed Genius, a film on how a young boy is pressured by his dad since childhood to always be the school topper and when he grows up, by his boss to reach targets. In 2019, Suseenthiran has also written the script for a sequel Vennila Kabaddi Kuzhu 2 but is busy with various other projects. He also directed two sports films with Kennedy Club and Champion.

His next film was Eeswaran (2021) starring Little Super Star Silambarasan released on the occasion of Pongal. At a time when fans are longing to witness that energetic Simbu on screen, which has been missing for years, Suseenthiran failed to please the star’s fans and family audience.

Filmography 

Actor
Naam (2003)
Deepavali (2007) 
Suttu Pidikka Utharavu (2019)

Other roles
Thozhar Venkatesan (2019; presenter)

References

External links 
 

1978 births
Film directors from Tamil Nadu
Tamil-language film directors
Living people
People from Dindigul district
21st-century Indian film directors
Directors who won the Best Popular Film Providing Wholesome Entertainment National Film Award